RILM Music Encyclopedias (RME) is an electronic collection of music reference works from 1775 to the present from Répertoire International de Littérature Musicale. RME expands every year by three to five titles.

RME was launched in December 2015 with 41 titles.

Scope and contents

The earliest RME piece , Jean Jacques Rousseau's Dictionnaire de musique, was published in 1775. RME also contains the first edition of “The Grove”, in an edition published by Theodore Presser in 1895.

The largest number of titles date from 2000 onward. These include Ken Bloom's Broadway, Lol Henderson and Lee Stacey's Encyclopedia of Music in the 20th Century, Peter Matzke et al., Das Gothic- und Dark Wave-Lexikon, and Richard Kostelanetz's Dictionary of the Avant-Gardes. The Handwörterbuch der musikalischen Terminologie, conceived between 1972 and 2006, is also included.

RME also holds The Garland Encyclopedia of World Music and Eileen Southern's Biographical Dictionary of Afro-American and African Musicians.

RME expands annually with additions of four titles in average. One of the titles, Komponisten der Gegenwart (KDG), is being regularly updated with new articles or additions to existing articles.

Stephen Henry mentions RME's “ability to provide access to some excellent European resources that might otherwise, not be available to libraries with less than comprehensive collections.”

Functionality

RME is accessible on EBSCOhost and RILM's platform Egret.

RME on Egret facilitates automatic translation of content to over 100 languages via Google Translate integration.  Users can set up  accounts where annotations and notes can be created, saved, and shared, cross references linking related content throughout RME, links to related content in RILM Abstracts of Music Literature and other resources, as well as an interface compatible with mobile and tablet devices.

Librarian Laurie Sampsel asserts that “cross searching the full text of so many titles yields results impossible (or highly unlikely) to find using the print versions of these encyclopedia's.”

Title list

At Launch (2016)
 Algemene muziekencyclopedie
 Annals of opera
 Band music notes
 Biographical dictionary of Afro-American and African music
 Biographical dictionary of musicians
 Biographical dictionary of Russian/Soviet composers
 Biographie universelle des musiciens
 Biographisch-bibliographisches Quellen-Lexikon
 Das Blasmusik-Lexikon: Komponisten - Autoren - Werke
 Broadway: An encyclopedia
 The Concise Garland encyclopedia of world music
 Conductors and composers of popular orchestral music
 Dictionary of American classical composers
 A dictionary of the avant-gardes
 Dictionnaire de la musique  (Les hommes et leurs oeuvres)
 Dictionnaire de la musique  (Science de la musique)
 Dictionnaire de musique
 Dictionnaire des oeuvres de l'art vocal
 Dizionario e bibliografia della musica
 Dizionario universale dei musicisti (Schmidl)
 Encyclopedia of American gospel music
 Encyclopedia of Music in the 20th Century
 Encyclopedia of recorded sound
 Encyclopedia of the American theatre organ
 Encyclopedia of the blues
 Garland encyclopedia of world music
 Das Gothic- und Dark Wave-Lexikon
 Großes Sängerlexikon
 Grove I: A Dictionary of music and musicians (1879)
 Handwörterbuch der musikalischen Terminologie
 Historical dictionary of the music and musicians of Finland
 Hollywood songsters: Singers who act and actors
 International encyclopedia of women composers
 Komponisten der Gegenwart
 March music notes
 Pangosmio lexiko
 The Paris opera 1-3
 Percussionists: A biographical dictionary 
 Riemanns Musik-Lexikon (11th edition)
 Steirisches Musiklexikon
 Tin Pan Alley: An encyclopedia of the Golden Age

2017 Additions
 Československý hudební slovník osob a institucí
 Encyclopédie de la musique et dictionnaire
 Editori Italiani
 Opernlexikon by Stieger

2018 Additions
 Enciclopédia da música brasileira 
 Il melodramma italiano 1861-1900; 1901-1926 
 Neues Historisch-biographisches Lexikon der Tonküstler 
 The 20th century violin concertante

2019 Additions (theme: musical instruments)
 Diccionario biográfico – bibliográfico – histórico – crítico de guitarras y guitarristas
 Musical instruments: A comprehensive dictionary
 Real-Lexikon der Musikinstrumente, zugleich ein Polyglossar für das gesamte Instrumentengebiet
 The stringed instruments of the Middle Ages: Their evolution and development
 A survey of musical instruments

2020 Additions (theme: rock)
 The encyclopedia of Australian rock and pop
 Lexikon Progressive Rock: Musiker, Bands, Instrumente, Begriffe
 Sachlexikon Rockmusik: Instrumente, Technik, Industrie

2021 Additions (theme: North America)
 The Canadian pop music encyclopedia
 Country music
 Diccionario enciclopédico de música en México

External links 
 RME on Egret

References 

Encyclopedias of music